(27 July 1930 – 26 June 2019) was a Japanese actor and jazz musician. He appeared in more than 100 films, including the Toho productions King Kong vs. Godzilla, Atragon, and Frankenstein vs. Baragon. He also performed in stage musicals such as My Fair Lady and appeared in several television shows.

Career
Takashima began participating in a jazz band while a student at Kwansei Gakuin University. He left the university before graduating when he joined the Shintoho studio, debuting as an actor in 1952. He starred in the 1962 film King Kong vs. Godzilla alongside Yū Fujiki, and subsequently acted with Fujiki in several comedy films about salarymen, which were popular in Japan at that time. Takashima also appeared in Son of Godzilla and Godzilla vs. Mechagodzilla II.

He gained popularity as a romantic lead who could also sing, which led to roles in stage musicals, including the role of Professor Henry Higgins in a 1963 production of My Fair Lady. He also appeared on several television programs, including the quiz show Quiz! Do-re-mi-fa-don! and the cooking show Gochisosama.

Personal life
In 1963, Takashima married Hanayo Sumi, a former member of Takarazuka Revue. His first-born son was murdered in 1964 at the age of five months by the family maid. He had two other sons, Masahiro Takashima and Masanobu Takashima, both of whom are actors. In 1998, Takashima developed depression, from which he subsequently recovered.

Takashima died of natural causes in his home in Tokyo on 26 June 2019 at age 88.

Filmography

References

External links
Official profile (in Japanese; archived from the original on 29 August 2018)

	
	

	
1930 births
2019 deaths	
People from Kobe
Kwansei Gakuin University alumni
Japanese male film actors
Japanese male television actors
20th-century Japanese male actors
20th-century Japanese musicians
Japanese television presenters
Japanese game show hosts
Japanese jazz musicians